Lochslin is a small hamlet, situated northeast of the fresh water loch, Loch Eye in Tain, Ross-shire, Scottish Highlands and is in the Scottish council area of Highland. Originally  a loch that dried up,  the loch survives in name only. Close to the village is the ancient ruin of Lochslin Castle.

References

Populated places in Ross and Cromarty
Clan Mackenzie